Era Bator Sur is a 1956 Assamese film directed by Bhupen Hazarika and produced by BP Films.
The film was choreographed by Priyambada Patel.

Background
Era Bator Sur is the first film of Dr Bhupen Hazarika. Dr. Bhupen Hazarika was then an active member of Indian people's Theater Association and in the fifties almost all the workers of I. P. T. A. were influenced by the sorrow and happiness, struggle and hope of the common mass and made themselves associated with creative works related to folk music and culture of the common Assamese people. The film was a result of one such effort. The story and the music of Era Bator Sur reflects the emotional rising of the people of that era. The theme of this movie is based on characters belonging to tea labourers society of Assam. The exploitations carried out by one class of the society also finds importance in the movie.

Cast
Phani Sarma
Bishnu Prasad Rabha
Balraj Sahni
 Bijoy Shankar
 Iva Achao
 Tassaduk Yusuf
 Anil Das 
 Punya Dowerah etc.

References

External links
Era Bator Sur at the Internet Movie Database

1956 films
Indian black-and-white films
Films set in Assam
1950s Assamese-language films